Broghil, also spelled Broghol, elevation , is a high mountain pass along the Durand Line border that crosses the Hindu Kush mountain range and connects Wakhan District of Badakhshan Province, Afghanistan with Chitral District of Khyber Pakhtunkhwa, Pakistan.

History 
Broghil is a relatively low pass. It was closed for about three months each winter because of snow, but for much of the rest of the year it was passable even for cart traffic.

It is one of the four major mountain passes entering Chitral District; the others are the Dorah Pass from Badakshan Province of Afghanistan, Shandur Top from Gilgit, and Lowari Top from Upper Dir District.

The area of Broghil is inhabited by Wakhi and Kyrgyz people.

European migration 
According to the National Geographic Genographic Project, Broghol Pass appears to be the route used by the ancestors of all modern Western Europeans to reach Europe. Modern Europeans carrying the M45 genetic marker crossed Broghol and then turned west; M45 further mutated to become M173 and then M343, which is carried by 70% of the population of England.

In popular culture
 The 1985 comedy movie Spies Like Us depicts Dan Aykroyd crossing the Broghol Pass on a mountain yak.

References

External links
Broghil, Chitral, Pakistan
National Geographic Genographic Project

Further reading  
 The Gilgit Game by John Keay (1985) 
 The Kafirs of the Hindukush (1896) Sir George Scott Robertson
 Khowar English Dictionary 

Mountain passes of Afghanistan
Chitral District
Wakhan
Mountain passes of Khyber Pakhtunkhwa
Landforms of Badakhshan Province